Xia Tun is located in Guozhuang, Ju County, Rizhao, Shandong Province, China. The dialect of Xia Tun is Qingdao dialect.

Shui Dong is on her east, with Guozhuang on the west. On the south is Wangjialing, and north is the Tianguangzhuang.

History 
Bing settled the village, named Zhaike in 1666 AD to hide away. To avoid the strong wind, they moved down from the Ridge, renamed the village as Xiazhuang (the village under the ridge). To avoid duplicating names, they renamed again, which is Xiatun until now.

References

Villages in China
Ju County